Barrie Community Sports Complex is a multi use sports facility located in Minesing, Ontario, Canada. Vintage Throne Stadium is the baseball park at the complex and is home to the Barrie Baycats of the Intercounty Baseball League.

References
Barrie Bay Cats

2000 establishments in Ontario
Baseball venues in Ontario
Minor league baseball venues
Buildings and structures in Simcoe County
Sports venues completed in 2000
Tourist attractions in Simcoe County